Leechia is a genus of moths of the family Crambidae.

Species
Leechia bilinealis South in Leech & South, 1901
Leechia exquisitalis (Caradja, 1927)
Leechia sinuosalis South in Leech & South, 1901

References

Schoenobiinae
Moths of Asia
Crambidae genera
Taxa named by Richard South